Kelly Anne McCormick (born February 13, 1960 in Anaheim, California) is a retired female diver from the United States. She twice competed for her native country at the Summer Olympics, winning a silver (1984) and a bronze medal (1988) in the Women's 3m Springboard event.

Kelly is the daughter of the famous diving champion Pat McCormick and diving coach Glenn McCormick. Growing up in Rossmoor, CA in the 1960s and 1970s Kelly’s first sport was gymnastics, and by the age of 13 she was an elite gymnast on the same team with Olympian Cathy Rigby. Kelly attended Los Alamitos High School where she began “playing around” with diving and then attended the Ohio State University to be coached by Vince Panzanno. By 1981 she had made the national team, and over the next ten years became a major figure of international status.

In 1982 Kelly won the first of 9 National Championships (6-3m springboard, 3-10m platform) and an Association for Intercollegiate Athletics for Women 3m springboard championship. In 1983 she won the Pan American Games gold medal, but in 1984 she battled a back injury that hospitalized her for six weeks before the Olympic trials. After being convinced to not quit, she recovered to win the Trials and then the Olympic silver medal on the 3m springboard in Los Angeles behind Canada’s Hall of Famer Sylvie Bernier.

In her second Pan American Games (1987, Indianapolis) Kelly took the gold becoming the first woman to win two consecutive Pan Am springboard gold medals. She won the 1988 Olympic trials with a torn calf muscle and the Olympic bronze medal in Seoul behind Hall of Famer Gao Min of China.

She now coaches at the same facility where she had her last meet, the Goodwill Games at the King County Aquatic Center in Federal Way, WA.

Personal life
She is married to Matt Robertson and resides in Seattle, Washington.

See also
 List of members of the International Swimming Hall of Fame

References

External links
 

1960 births
Living people
American female divers
Divers at the 1984 Summer Olympics
Divers at the 1988 Summer Olympics
Olympic silver medalists for the United States in diving
Olympic bronze medalists for the United States in diving
Sportspeople from Anaheim, California
Ohio State Buckeyes women's divers
Medalists at the 1988 Summer Olympics
Medalists at the 1984 Summer Olympics
Pan American Games gold medalists for the United States
Pan American Games medalists in diving
Divers at the 1983 Pan American Games
Divers at the 1987 Pan American Games
Medalists at the 1983 Pan American Games
Medalists at the 1987 Pan American Games